GMV may refer to:

 Gamo language
 GMV Innovating Solutions, a Spanish technology company
 GMV Nashville, an American record label
 GMV-6, now VTV, an Australian television station
 Great Malvern railway station, in England
 Greenwich Millennium Village, a residential area of London
 Grill Music Venue, a nightclub in Letterkenny, Ireland
 Gross merchandise volume
 Army Ground Mobility Vehicle, a vehicle project by the United States Army
 Ground Mobility Vehicle – (US)SOCOM program – specialized Humvees and GD Flyers used by U.S. Special Operations Forces
 Guaranteed minimum value